Millard K. Wilson (May 5, 1890 – October 5, 1933) was an American actor of the silent film era. He appeared in 94 films between 1914 and 1930, co-starring with Lon Chaney Sr. in some of them. Chaney and Wilson were life-long friends. Wilson died in Long Beach, California in 1933 in a road accident.

Partial filmography

 The Lion, the Lamb, the Man (1914)
 The Higher Law (1914)
 Stronger Than Death (1915)
 Under a Shadow (1915)
 The Millionaire Paupers (1915)
 A Mother's Atonement (1915)
 The Fascination of the Fleur de Lis (1915)
 The Pine's Revenge (1915)
 An Idyll of the Hills (1915)
 Dolly's Scoop (1916)
 The Flower of Doom (1917)
 The Pulse of Life (1917)
 Fighting Mad (1917)
 The Field of Honor (1917)
 A Woman's Fool (1918)
 The Branded Man (1918)
 Hell Bent (1918)
 Play Straight or Fight (1918)
 Smashing Through (1918)
 The Scarlet Drop (1918)
 Thieves' Gold (1918)
 Riders of Vengeance (1919)
 In the Days of Buffalo Bill (1922)
 The Costello Case (1930)

References

External links

1890 births
1933 deaths
American male silent film actors
Male actors from Louisville, Kentucky
20th-century American male actors
Road incident deaths in California